The Whole Town's Talking is a 1926 American silent adventure comedy film directed by Edward Laemmle and starring Edward Everett Horton, Virginia Lee Corbin, and Trixie Friganza. It is based on a play by Anita Loos and John Emerson.

Cast
 Edward Everett Horton as Chester Binney
 Virginia Lee Corbin as Ethel Simmons
 Trixie Friganza as Mrs. George Simmons
 Otis Harlan as George Simmonns
 Robert Ober as Donald Montallen
 Aileen Manning as Mrs. Van Loon
 Hayden Stevenson as Tom O'Brien
 Margaret Quimby as Sadie Wise
 Dolores del Río as Rita Renault - Movie Star
 Malcolm Waite as Jack Shields

Preservation status
Complete print held at UCLA Film & Television archive.

See also
 Ex-Bad Boy (1931)
 A Rumor of Love (1960)

References

External links 
 
 
 

1920s adventure comedy films
1926 romantic comedy films
1926 films
American adventure comedy films
American romantic comedy films
American silent feature films
Films directed by Edward Laemmle
Universal Pictures films
American black-and-white films
1920s American films
Silent romantic comedy films
Silent adventure comedy films
Silent American comedy films